Christina Martha Elena Scott  (born 25 December 1974) is a British civil servant and diplomat. She served as Governor of Anguilla between 2013 and 2017, and was the first woman to hold the post. She has been Deputy Head of Mission at the British Embassy Beijing since September 2018.

She was educated at Francis Holland School, Clarence Gate and Christ Church, Oxford.

Prior to her governorship of Anguilla, she was a civil servant:

 Director of the Civil Contingencies Secretariat in the Cabinet Office (2009–13)
 Private Secretary to the Prime Minister (2006–2009)

Scott has worked at HM Treasury, Department for Transport and at the European Commission.

She was appointed Companion of the Order of St Michael and St George (CMG) in the 2021 New Year Honours for services to British foreign policy.

Personal

Scott was married to the late Chris Martin (1973–2015), a civil servant. They separated in 2011 and he later remarried. They had no children from their marriage.

References

1974 births
Living people
People educated at Francis Holland School
Alumni of Christ Church, Oxford
Governors of Anguilla
Civil servants from London
Companions of the Order of St Michael and St George
Civil servants in the Cabinet Office
Private secretaries in the British Civil Service
Civil servants in HM Treasury
British diplomats
Civil servants in the Ministry of Transport (United Kingdom)